The 1974 Winston 500 was a NASCAR Winston Cup Series racing event that was held on May 5, 1974, at Alabama International Motor Speedway in Talladega, Alabama.

David Pearson acquired one of his superspeedway victories for the 1974 NASCAR Winston Cup Series season at this event. Tickets at this event sold at an average price of $10 ($ when adjusted for inflation). The green flag was waved at 1:00 PM, the checkered flag was waved at 4:28 PM.

Background
Talladega Superspeedway, originally known as Alabama International Motor Superspeedway (AIMS), is a motorsports complex located north of Talladega, Alabama. It is located on the former Anniston Air Force Base in the small city of Lincoln. The track is a Tri-oval and was constructed by International Speedway Corporation, a business controlled by the France Family, in the 1960s. Talladega is most known for its steep banking and the unique location of the start/finish line - located just past the exit to pit road. The track currently hosts the NASCAR series such as the Sprint Cup Series, Xfinity Series, and the Camping World Truck Series.

Race report
As was the case for the first half of the 1974 season, races were reduced by 10% because of the energy crisis.  As such, the 450-mile race symbolically started on "Lap 19," with the first 18 laps being listed as "not scored".  Engine problems caused most of the drivers not to finish the race.

Jerry Schild made his NASCAR Winston Cup Series debut in this event; starting in 37th and finishing 40th. David Pearson defeated Benny Parsons by 0.2 seconds after racing for 210 minutes. Sixty of these 170 laps were raced under yellow. This race was interrupted by rain approximately three times that day. David Pearson was the best driver on the racing grid during the event, everyone else was just hanging on trying to keep up with him. Bobby Allison had just as good a car and it seemed like he led more than 15 laps. Pearson survived when all of his top competition didn't finish.

A crowd of forty thousand would see the lead change 53 times. Chevrolet and Dodge vehicles would dominate the race's grid while Fords led the most laps. Gary Bettenhausen was dominating the early portions of the race in an AMC Matador until he got run into in the pits on lap 105. People who attended this race still remember sitting in the rain, hoping they would get the race in and they finally did. This was Iggy Katona's only NASCAR Cup Series race in the 1970s and his only one at Talladega. Katona's previous start had been in 1966.

Grant Adcox qualified for the event.  With a hundred laps in the books, a caution came out as Donnie Allison’s clutch burned out and David Sisco's motor went up in smoke.  Gary Bettenhausen, who had pitted a lap after the leaders, and was up on jacks as young Adcox came down for service.  Adcox's car hit an oil and water patch and slammed straight into the Bettenhausen Matador, causing catch can man Don Miller to be crushed between the cars.  A young crew member of the Nord Krauskopf team who was pitted nearby, Buddy Parrott, came rushing down to help, while Penske crewmembers John Woodward and Dale Watson were also injured. Miller was taken to the hospital and eventually had his right leg amputated.  Learning of the extent of Miller's injuries, an upset Adcox withdrew from the event.

Richard Petty was slow in qualifying; starting in 24th place. Petty and Yarborough had brought out their big block engines thinking that the reliability would pay off, but Pearson running a 351 Cleveland held on for the win. Both of the Allisons ran the small-block Chevrolets but they didn't hold up as well as the Fords. This was Charlie Roberts' last race as an owner. He owned Neil Bonnett’s car in this race.

The entire prize purse of this race was $144,280 ($ when adjusted for inflation); with the winner receiving $20,785 ($ when adjusted for inflation) while the last-place finisher received $1,175 ($ when adjusted for inflation). A 1973 Mercury Montego would become the winning vehicle at this race. David Pearson would earn the pole position at  during qualifying, as it was the first Talladega Cup race after NASCAR's phase out of the seven-litre engines, with all teams using a 358 ci (5833cc) engine formula that as of 2022 is still in use by NASCAR. it was the slowest Talladega Cup pole speed until Jeremy Mayfield's pole speed at the 2000 spring race.

Top 10 finishers

References

Winston 500
Winston 500
Winston 500
NASCAR races at Talladega Superspeedway